Andrew White, SJ (1579 – December 27, 1656) was an English Jesuit missionary who was involved in the founding of the Maryland colony. He was a chronicler of the early colony, and his writings are a primary source on the land, the Native Americans of the area, and the Jesuit mission in North America. For his efforts in converting and educating the native population, he is frequently referred to as the "Apostle of Maryland." He is considered a forefather of Georgetown University, and is memorialized in the name of its White-Gravenor building, a central location of offices and classrooms on the university's campus.

Early life in Europe
Born in London in 1579, he began formal education at age 14 at the English College at Douai, France. He entered English College of St. Alban's in Valladolid, Spain, in 1595 at the same time as other notable English Catholic priests, including the later Saint and martyr Thomas Garnet. He sought further education in Seville, and was ordained at Douai in 1605, after which he returned to England. Caught up in a wave of anti-Catholic arrests following the Gunpowder Plot, he was arrested and in 1606, banished from England. Moving to Leuven in Belgium, he joined the Society of Jesus on February 1, 1607. Despite the threat of capital punishment, White returned in 1609 to preach in Southern England. At the same time, he took positions as prefect of the seminaries at Louvain and Liège, between which and his English missions he split his time.

Sir George Calvert, the first Baron Baltimore (1579-1632), whom White is credited in helping to turn to Catholicism in 1625, wrote to White from his colony on the Avalon Peninsula in Newfoundland after 1628. White's further interest in America is shown a letter from Superior General Mutio Vitelleschi in a letter dated March 3, 1629, approving a mission to America. Though Sir George Calvert died in 1632, his eldest son, Cecilius Calvert (1605-1675), inherited the title as second Baron Baltimore, continued the colonization program of his father. Lord Baltimore had wanted White to help found a new colony in the northern Chesapeake Bay which had been chartered by King Charles I on June 20, 1632. White himself wrote of the benefits of converting the native population, and in a document dated February 10, 1633, he specifically advocates Catholic settlement in "lord Baltimore's Plantation in Mary-land." He describes to potential financiers a paradisaical land with majestic forests and fruitful soil, advertising  of land for each potential settler.

Colonization in Maryland

On November 22, 1633, he took Lord Baltimore's offer and set sail from Cowes, England on the Isle of Wight with planned proprietary first Governor of Maryland, Lord Leonard Calvert (1606-1647), (younger brother of Cecilius Calvert (1605–1675), second Lord Baltimore) and fellow Jesuits John Altham Gravenor and Thomas Gervase on The Ark, one of George Calvert's ships, accompanied by The Dove, crossing the North Atlantic Ocean.  After a brief stop further south in Jamestown, Virginia, to consult with colonial authorities there and to resupply, the ships moved north up the Chesapeake Bay, with their landing on March 25, 1634, on St. Clement's Island off the north shore of the Potomac River, slightly upstream from the Chesapeake Bay, marks the birth of the colony of the Province of Maryland. The anniversary of this date is now celebrated annually state-wide as Maryland Day. By July of that year, White had written his first discussion on the new colony, titled A Relation of the Sucessefull Beginnings of the Lord Baltimore's Plantation in Maryland. Sections of this were used to further advertise the colony. In erecting a large cross, then celebrating a Catholic Mass of thanksgiving that day, he became the first priest to do so in the original thirteen English colonies.

White wrote in his "Annual Letters of the English Province," while recounting speaking to a Piscataway man named Archihu, that White's purpose in this area was "not to make war, but out of good will towards them, in order to extend civilization and instruction to his ignorant race, and show them the way to heaven." In these letters, Andrew White also recounts colonizing the land St. Marys sits on. Originally, “in order to avoid every appearance of injustice” White's party “bought” the land from the Indigenous, paying in “axes, hatchets, rakes, and several yards of cloth” in exchange for “thirty miles of that land.”  The Yaocomico's had planned to leave the area anyway and agreed to turn over their village to the English settlers. White recounts the miracle of how the Indigenous people “[surrendered] themselves like lambs."

White spent most of the next decade in St. Mary's City, working on efforts to convert Indigenous peoples and children to Catholicism. In 1637 they were joined by fellow Jesuits Thomas Copley and Ferdinand Poulton, and between 1634 and 1650 there averaged four permanent Jesuits in the Maryland Provincial Colony. To further his missionary work, he wrote dictionaries and translated the catechism into the native languages. On July 5, 1640, he famously converted Chitomachon, the chief of the Piscataway Indians, to Christianity. The chief was baptized as Charles. He later baptized a daughter of the Patuxent Indians, and much of her tribe.

In 1933, the architect and writer Christopher La Farge, for the upcoming Tricentenary, 300th Anniversary of the founding of Maryland, designed a monument to Father White that is located just outside St. Mary's City.

Return to England
The English Civil War (1642–1651) was to cut short his missionary work. In 1644, Richard Ingle and Puritan colonists from the neighboring Virginia colony of Jamestown, which had previously rebuffed George Calvert's visit, first raided the colonial capital at St. Mary's City. Ingle succeeded in burning the town and, with the aid of William Claiborne, (who earlier operated a trading post on Kent Island in the Chesapeake), in controlling the Province of Maryland colony. White was again arrested for his 'evil' preaching, and in 1645 he was sent with Thomas Copley in chains to London. Once there, he was tried for the crime of returning to England after being banished in 1606, which carried the punishment of death. He escaped this fate by arguing that his return was not of his own will. His petitions to return to Maryland denied, he spent the last decade of his life quietly in England until his death on December 27, 1656.

Works
A Declaration of the Lord Baltimore's Plantation in Mary-land, nigh upon Virginia: manifesting the Nature, Quality, Condition and rich Utilities it contayneth. London 1633. Facsimile ed. by Lawrence C. Wroth, Baltimore 1929.
Declaratio Coloniae Domini Baronis de Baltamoro in Terra Mariae prope Virginiam. qua ingenium, natura et conditio Regionis, et Multiplices Ejus Utilitates Ac Divitiae Describuntur. Compiled in Woodstock Letters 1, Bethesda 1872.
A Relation of the Sucessefull Beginnings of the Lord Baltimore's Plantation in Maryland. Being an extract of certaine Letters written from thence, by some of the Aduenturers, to their friends in England. To which is added, The Conditions of plantation propounded by his Lordship for the second voyage intended this present yeere, 1634. London 1634. Incomplete reproduction in John D.G. Shea: Early Southern Tracts 1, New York 1965. The original manuscript version (specified as the Lechford version) first printed in The Calvert Papers, volume 3, Maryland Historical Society Fund Publications 28, 34 - 35, Baltimore 1899. 
A Relation of Maryland. London 1635.
Objections Answered Touching Maryland. In: A Moderate and Safe Expedient to Remove Jealousies and Feares, of Any Danger, or Prejudice to This State, by the Roman Catholicks of This Kingdome, and to Mitigate the Censure of Too Much Severity towards Them, with a Great Advantage of Honour and Profit to This State and Nation. London (?) 1646.

See also
Jesuit missions in North America

References

External links

A section of a catechism written by White probably in the Piscataway language

English Roman Catholic missionaries
People of colonial Maryland
Georgetown University people
16th-century English Jesuits
17th-century English Jesuits
American colonial clergy
Roman Catholic missionaries in the United States
1579 births
1656 deaths